Rhododendron sanguineum (血红杜鹃) is a rhododendron species native to southeast Xizang and northwest Yunnan, China, where it grows at altitudes of . Flowers are red.

Synonyms
 Rhododendron sanguineum subsp. sanguineoides Cowan
 Rhododendron sanguineum var. sanguineoides (Cowan) Davidian
 Rhododendron sanguineum subsp. sanguineum
 Rhododendron sanguineum var. sanguineum

References
 Franchet, J. Bot. (Morot). 12: 259. 1898.

sanguineum